The 1st Coppa Italia was a motor race, run to Formula One rules, held on 12 October 1961 at Vallelunga Circuit. The race was run over two heats of 30 laps of the circuit, and was won by Italian driver Giancarlo Baghetti  in a Porsche 718.

After the Italian Drivers' Championship finished as a tie between Giancarlo Baghetti and Lorenzo Bandini, a deciding race was organised. However, the fairness of this idea is in question since it was well known that Bandini would not be available to take part. Baghetti's team, Scuderia Sant Ambroeus, borrowed the Porsche from Ecurie Nationale Suisse, and their driver won both heats to take the national title.

Results

References

 "The Grand Prix Who's Who", Steve Small, 1995.
 "The Formula One Record Book", John Thompson, 1974.
 Baghetti article at 8W 
 Article at Atlas F1 - Rear View Mirror 

Coppa Italia